Nikola Roganovic (born 12 December 1985) is a Serbian-Australian footballer who plays for South Melbourne FC in the NPL Victoria.

Club career

Victorian Premier League
Nikola Roganović began his senior career in 2006 with Springvale White Eagles FC, a Serbian-backed club. He won the 2009 VPL Grand Final with Altona Magic before switching to Green Gully and playing in their back-to-back Championships in 2010 and 2011.

Melbourne Heart 
On 18 September 2011, he signed with A-League club Melbourne Heart. He Made his debut in the 2011–12 A-League season in Round 1 against Newcastle Jets. On 6 April 2012 it was announced that he would be leaving the club.

South Melbourne FC
After a two-year break from football, Roganovic returned to sign with South Melbourne FC in February 2015.

Short retirement and return to football
At the conclusion of the 2017 NPL Season, Nikola announced his retirement due to family and business commitments. However, during the 2018 season, Roganovic became an injury replacement keeper for Richmond in the State League 1. Following a series of strong performances, he re-signed during the mid-season transfer window with his former club South Melbourne for the remainder of the 2018 season. During the 2019 NPL Victoria season, Roganovic played his 100th game for South Melbourne against local rivals Melbourne Knights.

Honours

Club 
 Green Gully
 Victorian Premier League Champions: 2010, 2011
 Victorian Premier League Premiers: 2011
 Altona Magic
 Victorian Premier League Champions: 2008, 2009
 South Melbourne FC
 National Youth League Champions: 2003
 Dockerty Cup: 2015
 National Premier Leagues Victoria Premiers: 2015
NPL Victoria Champions: 2016

Personal life 
Nikola was born in Belgrade, Serbia on 12 December 1985. He is the younger brother of music producer Dragan Roganović (better known by the stage name of Dirty South).

References

External links 

1985 births
Living people
A-League Men players
Australian soccer players
Melbourne City FC players
Australian people of Serbian descent
Association football goalkeepers
National Premier Leagues players